Francisco Escudero García de Goizueta (13 August 1912 – 17 June 2002) was a Basque composer.

Life and career

He was born in Zarautz, Gipuzkoa, on August 13, 1912. He began his musical studies at the San Sebastián Municipal Music Academy with Beltrán Pagola, and continued in Madrid, where he was a Composition student of Conrado del Campo.

He was awarded the Spanish National Fine Arts Award (Premio Nacional de Bellas Artes) for his Trío bucólico in 1937. During the Spanish Civil War he moved to France.

In 1945 he became director of the Coral de Bilbao.

He was awarded the Gold Medal of Merit in the Fine Arts.

In 1957 he obtained the National Music Prize.

In 1960 he created the City of San Sebastián Band. He composed the opera Zigor, with a Basque theme, which premiered in Bilbao and then in Madrid and San Sebastián with great success, once again obtaining a National Music Award (second one).

As part of his teaching work, he directed the San Sebastián Municipal Higher Conservatory of Music. It was during this period, in 1979, that the historic San Sebastián conservatory was granted the capacity to teach the Superior Degree of music studies. His disciples are, among others, Javier Jacinto, José Luis Marco, Ramon Lazkano, Ángel Illarramendi, Alberto Iglesias, Roberto Bienzobas and most of the faculty at the San Sebastián Conservatory as well as other musical centers in Spain.

Awards
 Spanish National Fine Arts Award (Premio Nacional de Bellas Artes), 1937
 Gold Medal of Merit in the Fine Arts
 National Music Prize, 1957
 National Music Award (second one), 1960

Selected works 
 Pinceladas vascas
 Zigor
 Gernika 
 Eusko Salmoa
 Sinfonía mítica
 Illeta
 Aránzazu (symphonic poem)
 Evocación en Itziar
 Concierto Vasco para piano y orquesta
 Concierto para violoncello y orquesta
 Sinfonía Sacra
 Fantasía geosinfónica

References 

Basque classical composers
1912 births
2002 deaths
20th-century Spanish musicians